Murong Hui (慕容廆, 269 – 4 June 333), courtesy name Yiluo (弈洛), was an Xianbei chief, formally known as Duke Xiang of Liaodong, posthumously honored as Emperor Wuxuan (武宣皇帝). In the Book of Jin, Murong Hui was described as tall, physically strong and having a beautiful appearance.

Murong Hui had initially been a Xianbei chief who fought Jin forces during the late reign of Emperor Wu of Jin, Jin's founding emperor, but he submitted as a Jin vassal in 289.  Under constant attack by fellow Xianbei chief Duan Jie of the Duan tribe, he humbly sought peace with the Duan and married one of Duan Jie's daughters.  From this union came Murong Huang (in 297) and two of his younger brothers, Murong Ren and Murong Zhao.

During Murong Hui's rule as tribal chief, the Jin Dynasty's central government was in constant turmoil and eventually collapsed due to infighting and agrarian rebellions, the strongest of which was the Xiongnu state Han Zhao.  As a result, many refugees arrived in the relatively safe domain of Murong Hui's, and as he treated the ethnically Han refugees with kindness, most chose to stay, greatly strengthening his power, and as Jin forces in the north gradually fell to Han Zhao's capable general Shi Le (who later established his own independent state Later Zhao), Murong Hui became the only domain in northern China still under titular Jin rule, carrying the Jin-bestowed title of the Duke of Liaodong.  He entrusted Murong Huang with many important military tasks such as fighting the powerful fellow Xianbei Yuwen tribe in 320 and 325.  In early 322, Murong Hui named Murong Huang heir apparent.  However, Murong Hui also greatly favored Murong Huang's brothers Murong Ren, Murong Zhao, and particularly Murong Han, who was regarded very highly as a general.  Murong Huang became jealous and suspicious of these brothers, feelings which became known to them and which would sow the seeds of future troubles.

See also 

 Song of the Xianbei Brother

Family
Consort and issue(s):
Empress Wuxuan, of the Duan clan (武宣皇后 段氏)
Murong Huang, Prince Wenming (文明王慕容皝; 297– 25 October 348), third son
Murong Ren, Duke of Liaodong (遼東公慕容仁, d. 336), fourth son
Murong Zhao (慕容昭, d. 333), fifth son
Unknown
Murong Han (慕容翰, d. 344), first son
Second son
Murong You, sixth son
Murong Zhi, seventh son
Murong Jūn, Prince Xiangyang, eight son
Murong Han, ninth son
Murong Ping, Prince Shangyong (上庸王 慕容評), tenth son
Murong Biao, Prince Wuchang (武昌王 ), eleventh son
Princess Murong (慕容氏, d. 341), first daughter
Married Tuoba Shiyijian (拓跋什翼犍), a son of Tuoba Yulü

References

Jin dynasty (266–420) generals
Former Yan people
269 births
333 deaths
People from Jinzhou
Political office-holders in Liaoning
Jin dynasty (266–420) politicians
Politicians from Liaoning
Generals from Liaoning